"Will I Do (Till the Real Thing Comes Along)" is a song recorded by Canadian country music group Prairie Oyster. It was released in March 1992 as the third single from their third studio album, Everybody Knows. It peaked at number 10 on the RPM Country Tracks chart in July 1992.

Chart performance

Year-end charts

References

1992 singles
Prairie Oyster songs
RCA Records singles
Song recordings produced by Josh Leo
1991 songs
Songs written by Joan Besen